Elizabeth Oswelia Yáñez Robles (born 29 September 1945) is a Mexican politician affiliated with the PAN. As of 2013 she served as Deputy of both the LIX and LXII Legislatures of the Mexican Congress representing Guanajuato.

References

1945 births
Living people
Politicians from Torreón
Women members of the Chamber of Deputies (Mexico)
National Action Party (Mexico) politicians
21st-century Mexican politicians
21st-century Mexican women politicians
Celaya Institute of Technology alumni
Charles III University of Madrid alumni
Deputies of the LXII Legislature of Mexico
Members of the Chamber of Deputies (Mexico) for Guanajuato